Easwari Engineering College (EEC), is an engineering college located in Ramapuram, Chennai, Tamil Nadu, India, located right next to SRM University and SRM Dental College is a member of the Sri Ramaswamy Memorial (SRM) Group of Educational Institutions for higher learning. The college was instituted in 1996 and is affiliated with Anna University since 2012, now autonomous (since 2019) The college offers eleven undergraduate and six postgraduate programs.

Academics
, the college offers eleven undergraduate and six postgraduate programs covering engineering and technology and management. All the faculty members are student friendly. The college is affiliated to Anna University and approved by the All India Council for Technical Education (AICTE).

Departments
The college comprises eleven engineering departments, seven science and humanities departments and an MBA department.

Engineering departments
 Mechanical Engineering
 Computer Science Engineering
 Electrical and Electronics Engineering
 Electronics and Communication Engineering
 Electronics and Instrumentation Engineering
 Information Technology
 Civil Engineering
 Automobile Engineering
 BioMedical Engineering 
 Robotics & Automation Engineering
 Artificial Intelligence and Data Science

Science and humanities departments
 Chemistry
 English
 Maths
 Physics
 Library
 Physical Education
 Counselling
Post Graduate
 Master of Business Administration
 Master of Engineering (Computer Science and Engineering)
 Master of Engineering (Communication Systems)
 Master of Engineering (Embedded Systems)

Campus
Easwari Engineering College has seven multi-storeyed academic blocks, namely the main block (CSE/EEE/IT), mechanical engineering block, electronics block I & II (ECE/EIE), civil engineering block, P.G. block (MBA/MCA).

Other facilities within the campus include food courts and canteens, supermarket and departmental stores, telecom facilities, a bank with ATM (City Union Bank), DTP and Internet centers. The main library is housed in the P.G. Block. 

Student support activities,
1. Campus life 
2. Placement
3. Value added course
4. Entrepreneurship
5. Pride activities
6. Foreign Language
7. Sports 
8. Student clubs

References

External links
 

Engineering colleges in Chennai